Emmanuel Gyamfi (born 16 December 1994) is a Ghanaian footballer who plays as a winger for Asante Kotoko and Ghana.

Club career
Gyamfi started his career Wa All Stars. In 2014, Gyamfi signed for Armenian club Shirak, making 9 appearances in the Armenian Premier League, scoring once. Ahead of the 2016 Ghanaian Premier League, Gyamfi returned to his native Ghana, signing for Asante Kotoko, making 12 appearances in his first season back in the division.

International career
On 25 May 2017, Gyamfi made his debut for Ghana in a 1–1 draw against Benin.

References

1994 births
Living people
Footballers from Kumasi
Association football wingers
Ghanaian footballers
Ghana international footballers
FC Shirak players
Asante Kotoko S.C. players
Armenian Premier League players
Ghanaian expatriate footballers